Cable Dahmer Arena (formerly, Silverstein Eye Centers Arena and Independence Events Center) is a 5,800-seat multi-purpose arena in Independence, Missouri, United States. It was opened in November 2009. It serves as the home arena and administrative offices for Kansas City Mavericks in the ECHL, as well as hosts the home games of the Kansas City Comets of the Major Arena Soccer League. The arena will host more than 100 events every year, with a very large spectrum of its events including:  trade shows, professional sporting events, festivals, community events, concerts and its primary tenant, Kansas City Mavericks.

The arena which is owned by the city of Independence is just southeast of the Interstate 70/Interstate 470 interchange. The privately owned Independence Center shopping center is just north of it across Interstate 70.

Features
Community Ice Rink (2nd Sheet of Ice) located within the Events Center 
2 8' 3-13/16" Tall x 35' 4-5/16" Wide Daktronics sidewall video boards at 6mm pixel density
2 12'5" Tall x 71'9" Wide Daktronics endwall video boards at 6mm pixel density
More video board pixels than the T-Mobile Center
360° LED ribbon board (used as scorebars under each video wall)
200 VIP style loge seats
8 Visiting locker rooms
29 luxury suites
4 full service concession stands
7 full service box office windows

Events 
The arena has hosted many artists including Ariana Grande (who kicked off her major world tour here), Bruno Mars, Alan Jackson, and many more. On February 26, 2020, the arena hosted an episode of AEW Dynamite. Another episode was filmed at the arena on November 3, 2021. On March 9–13, 2021 the arena hosted the 91st annual Boys MSHSAA State Wrestling Tournament and the 3rd annual Girls MSHSAA State Wrestling Tournament.

References

External links
Cable Dahmer Arena website

2009 establishments in Missouri
Buildings and structures in Independence, Missouri
College ice hockey venues in the United States
Indoor ice hockey venues in Missouri
Indoor soccer venues in Missouri
Sports venues completed in 2009
Sports venues in Missouri
Tourist attractions in Jackson County, Missouri